Westford is a census-designated place (CDP) and the primary hamlet in the town of Westford, Otsego County, New York, United States. It was first listed as a CDP prior to the 2020 census.

The community is in eastern Otsego County, slightly north of the center of the town of Westford.

Demographics

References 

Census-designated places in Otsego County, New York
Census-designated places in New York (state)